Betrothed or The Betrothed may refer to:

The Betrothed (Manzoni novel), translation of the Italian I Promessi Sposi
The Betrothed (Scott novel), a novel by Sir Walter Scott
The Betrothed (poem), published in 1886
 The Betrothed (miniseries), an Italy TV mini-series starring Burt Lancaster
 The Betrothed (1923 film), a silent Italian film directed by Mario Bonnard
 The Betrothed (1941 film), an Italian film directed by Mario Camerini
 The Betrothed (1964 film), an Italian film directed by Mario Maffei
 "Betrothed" (short story), a 1903 short story by Anton Chekhov

See also 
 Betrothal